The 1993 Cal State Northridge Matadors football team represented California State University, Northridge as a member of the  American West Conference (AWC) during the 1993 NCAA Division I-AA football season. This was the first season that the Matadors competed at the NCAA Division I-AA level, as they had previously been at the NCAA Division II level. Led by eighth-year head coach Bob Burt, Cal State Northridge compiled an overall record of 4–6 with a mark of 1–3 in conference play, tying for fourth place in the AWC. The team outscored its opponents 229 to 222 for the season. The Matadors played home games at North Campus Stadium in Northridge, California.

Schedule

References

Cal State Northridge
Cal State Northridge Matadors football seasons
Cal State Northridge Matadors football